WFCU Centre is an arena and entertainment centre in Windsor, Ontario, Canada. WFCU Centre replaced the 84-year-old Windsor Arena as the primary home of the Windsor Spitfires. It opened on December 11, 2008, in the east end of the city. WFCU Centre is owned by the City of Windsor, operated by Comcast Spectacor, and named for Windsor Family Credit Union.

History
City council approved the project on October 4, 2006, and the groundbreaking ceremony took place on January 22, 2007. The WFCU Centre was built at a cost of approximately $71 million by the Windsor, Ontario-based construction company, PCR Contractors. The land was purchased from London, Ontario developer Farhi Holdings Corporation. The construction of this sports-entertainment centre was decided upon as a part of the city government's overall effort to add excitement to the economy. As part of that effort, Windsor city council committed to building the centre, and agreed to fund most of the cost.

During the initial stages of planning, several other committees and companies proposed building arenas and venues in the area, including a privately owned skating arena, as well as proposed a relocation of the Windsor Raceway Slots to Tecumseh, Ontario, owned by the Ontario Lottery and Gaming Corporation.

In August, 2013 Windsor City Council approved a $6.5 million addition to the WFCU Centre, adding a 25-metre pool in advance of the city hosting the 2016 FINA World Swimming Championships (25 m) which were held inside the WFCU Centre. The WFCU Centre complies with the Ontarians with Disabilities Act.

Sports

The WFCU Centre is home to both the OHL's Windsor Spitfires and the NBLC's Windsor Express.

The Windsor Spitfires won both the 2009 and 2010 OHL Championship final series on home ice, and the Windsor Express won the 2014 League Championships on home court.

The WFCU Centre has played host to a variety of large-scale events in hockey including the 2012 World U-17 Hockey Challenge, the OHL All Star Game and the CHL/NHL Top Prospects Game. The WFCU Centre also hosted both the Skate Canada Synchronized Skating Championships and the Skate Canada International in 2012, the latter being broadcast internationally. The WFCU Centre also played host to the Grey Power World Cup of Curling in 2010.

The WFCU Centre hosted the 2017 Memorial Cup.

References

External links
WFCU Centre official website
City of Windsor WFCU Centre information page
Eastside Arena web site, operated by arena building consortium
Windsor Spitfires, WFCU Centre Ontario Hockey League tenant
Photo gallery from the WFCU Centre's interior

Sports venues in Windsor, Ontario
Indoor ice hockey venues in Ontario
Ontario Hockey League arenas
Music venues in Ontario
Windsor Express
2008 establishments in Ontario
Sports venues completed in 2008
Basketball venues in Ontario